Marlena Gola (born 8 June 1998) is a Polish athlete specialising track and field sprinter. She won the gold medal at the 2021 European Team Championships and 2021 IAAF World Relays. She also took the bronze medal at the 2019 European Athletics U23 Championships.

Marlena is a three-time winner of the Polish Athletics Championships in the 200 metres.

Personal bests
Outdoor
100 metres – 11.48 (Bielsko-Biała 2021)
200 metres – 23.33 (Chorzów 2021)

Indoor
60 metres – 7.48 (Toruń 2020)
200 metres – 23.64 (Toruń 2020)

International competitions

References

External links

Living people
1998 births
Sportspeople from Białystok
Polish female sprinters
Polish Athletics Championships winners